Dartford Rural District was a rural district with an area of  in the county of Kent, England.  In 1971 it had a population of 64,561 and an electorate of 43,911. At dissolution it was the most populous rural district council in Kent, but had once been larger, having lost territory when Crayford Urban District was created in 1920, and Swanscombe Urban District in 1926.

On 1 April 1974 it was split between the borough of Dartford and the new district of Sevenoaks. The civil parishes of Ash-cum-Ridley, Eynsford, Eynsford-Crockenhill, Farningham, Fawkham, Hartley, Horton Kirby, Swanley, and West Kingsdown, all of which became part of Sevenoaks District, are sometimes still collectively referred to as the 'Northern Parishes'. Longfield civil parish originally went to Sevenoaks, but was transferred to Dartford Borough in 1987.

At the time of its dissolution it consisted of the following 15 civil parishes. In 1971 it had 27 councillors who held office for 3 years.  Elections for one-third of the seats were held every year.

Ash-cum-Ridley (1 councillor)
Darenth (2 councillors)
Eynsford (1 councillor)
Eynsford-Crockenhill (1 councillor)
Farningham (1 councillor)
Fawkham (1 councillor)
Hartley (1 councillor)
Horton Kirby (1 councillor)
Longfield (1 councillor)
Southfleet (1 councillor)
Stone (4 councillors)
Sutton-at-Hone (2 councillors)
Swanley (6 councillors)
West Kingsdown (1 councillor)
Wilmington (3 councillors)

References

Districts of England created by the Local Government Act 1894
Districts of England abolished by the Local Government Act 1972
History of Kent
Borough of Dartford
History of local government in London (1889–1965)
Rural districts of England